José Ruiz de Arana y Saavedra (1826 – 1891), often referred to as the Duke of Baena after his marriage to María Rosalía Luisa Osorio de Moscoso y Carvajal, Duchess of Baena, was a Spanish aristocrat, military officer and politician. He held the nobiliary title of "Count of Sevilla la Nueva".

Biography 
Born in Madrid on 28 August 1826. One of the many lovers of Queen Isabella II from 1850 to 1856, he is the presumed biological father of Infanta Isabella (born 1851), known as La Chata. He married María Rosalía Luisa Osorio de Moscoso y Carvajal, Duchess of Baena, on 26 February 1859.

During the reign of Isabella II, he served as Senator for life as well as deputy. He returned to the Senate as senator for life after the Bourbon Restoration, as part of the dynastic Liberal Party. He also was Gentilhombre de cámara, and served as Ambassador before the Holy See during a Sagasta government.

He reached the military rank of Colonel.

He died at his property in Sevilla la Nueva on 23 June 1891.

References 

Members of the Senate of the Spanish Restoration
Members of the Congress of Deputies of the reign of Isabella II
Members of the Senate of Spain of the reign of Isabella II
Knights of Santiago
Counts of Spain
1826 births
1891 deaths